The Oceania Road Championships are a series of road cycling races held annually to determine the Oceanian champion in each event. The event has been held since 1995 and consists of an elite and under-23 men's and an elite women's road race and time trial.

The Oceania Cycling Confederation hosts the events to  provide an opportunity for athletes to gain UCI points, and to help selection for national team representation at world championships.

Competitions

Men's events

Road race
The road race championship races for elite and U23 riders were combined, except for 2009(1).

Time trial
The ITT championship races for elite and U23 riders were combined, except for 2009, 2011, 2013, 2014 and 2017, when U23 riders raced on a shorter course than the elite riders. In 2007(1) (Hayden Josefski), 2009(2) (Michael Matthews), and 2012 (Damien Howson) the U23 champions clocked better times than the elite champions. However, U23 riders were not eligible for the elite title at this time, a rule which later has been discarded by the UCI.

Women

Road race

Time trial

U23

Road race

Time trial

References

External links
 Official website
 Men's road race results
 Men's time trial results
 Women's road race results
 Women's time trial results

UCI Oceania Tour races
Cycle races in Australia
Recurring sporting events established in 1995
Road bicycle races
Under-23 cycle racing